This is a list of animated films produced in Pakistan.

Featured films 
This is a list of Pakistani animated films with their release year, studio, directors and languages.

Upcoming films 
This is a list of Pakistani animated upcoming films.

See also 
 List of Pakistani animated television series

References 

Pakistani
animated
 
Pakistani art